Philantomba is a mammal genus which contains three species of duiker, a type of small antelope.  The three species are Maxwell's duiker (Philantomba maxwellii), the blue duiker (Philantomba monticola) and the 
Walter's duiker (Philantomba walteri).

References

Mammal genera
Duikers
Taxa named by Edward Blyth